Sven Michel (born 30 March 1988) is a Swiss curler from Matten. He won a gold medal for Switzerland at the 2013 European Curling Championships and skipped Switzerland at the 2014 Winter Olympics.

Career
As a junior curler, Michel won the bronze medal at the 2007 World Junior Curling Championships, playing third for Christian von Gunten.

Michel won a silver medal at the 2010 European Mixed Curling Championship, playing second for Claudio Pätz. Later in the season, he and partner Alina Pätz won the gold medal at the 2011 World Mixed Doubles Curling Championship. Michel would then become one of the top skips in Switzerland, and would represent his country at the 2011 and 2012 European Curling Championships as skip. He also represented Switzerland at the 2013 Ford World Men's Curling Championship, Michel's first world championship appearance, placing 7th. Later that year, Michel led his country to a gold medal at the 2013 European Championships.

Michel's success led him to be selected by the Swiss Curling Association to represent the country at the 2014 Winter Olympics. At the games, he led Switzerland to an 8th-place finish with a 3-6 record. More recently he competed in the 2022 Winter Olympics with the Swiss Men's team, finishing 7th.

Michel won his first World Curling Tour event in September 2011 when he won the 2011 Baden Masters. Since then he has also won the 2012 Baden Masters and the 2014 German Masters. Michel finished second in the 2022 World Mixed Doubles Curling Championship in  Geneva with Alina Pätz. The pair were defeated 7-9 in the final by Muirhead and Lammie of Scotland.

Personal life
Michel is employed as a bricklayer. He is in a relationship with fellow curler Alina Pätz.

Grand Slam record

References

External links

 Team site 

1988 births
Swiss male curlers
Living people
Curlers at the 2014 Winter Olympics
Olympic curlers of Switzerland
People from Interlaken
European curling champions
World mixed doubles curling champions
Continental Cup of Curling participants
Curlers at the 2022 Winter Olympics
Sportspeople from the canton of Bern